Patrick James "Pat" McGlynn (born 31 March 1958 in Edinburgh, Scotland) is a former rhythm guitarist for the Bay City Rollers.

In late 1976, McGlynn briefly joined the Rollers as a replacement for band member Ian Mitchell.  McGlynn usually played rhythm guitar in the band, occasionally switching to bass on stage in songs that featured Stuart Wood on keyboards.

In 1977, McGlynn released "She'd Rather Be with Me", which peaked at number 65 in Australia.

McGlynn was gone from the band early the following year, and would subsequently enjoy some success in Japan and Germany as leader of his own band, Pat McGlynn's Scotties.  In 1993, his composition "So Much of Your Love" was sung by Sonia in the British heat of the Eurovision Song Contest.

In 2003, McGlynn accused former Bay City Rollers manager Tam Paton of trying to rape him in a hotel room in 1977. However, the police decided there was insufficient evidence to prosecute Paton. Paton had previous arrests for sexual misconduct with underage boys.

In May 2005, McGlynn and former Rollers lead singer Les McKeown were arrested and later cleared on drug charges.

References

External links

Living people
Bay City Rollers members
1958 births
Scottish pop guitarists
Male bass guitarists
Scottish bass guitarists
Musicians from Edinburgh